Daegu High School is a Korean public high school located in Daegu, South Korea. The school was appointed as a Subject-oriented & Liberal public high school in 2009. In 2017, the number of alumni exceeded 31,000.

History
The school was approved on 12 March 1958. The digital library was installed on 4 October 2001.

Daegu High School in Camp Walker 
Daegu High School is located on Camp Walker, Daegu, Korea. This camp was named for Lt. Gen Walton Walker, a highly decorated veteran of World War I and World War II. General Walker was the commander of the 8th Army during the Korean War and his defense of the Naktong Line is regarded as a military classic. He died December 23, 1959, in a non-hostile accident while serving in Korea. The camp was memorialized in May 1960. Major tenant units assigned to Camp Walker included the 36th Signal Battalion, 168th Medical Battalion and the American Forces Network-Korea (AFN-K) Daegu Detachment. The 36th Signal Battalion provided strategic communications in support of customers in Area III and IV. It planned, installed, operated, maintained and defended command, control, communications, computers and information technology (C4IT) systems in support of combined, joint and Army operations. The 168th Medical Battalion (Area Support) provided Armistice healthcare, operating 13 clinics in Korea, including Wood Health Clinic on Camp Walker. Also, the Battalion provided preventive medicine support, field sanitation team training, food/water analysis, food facility and Department of Agriculture equipment inspections. The AFN-K Daegu Detachment provided radio and television entertainment and command information to families living in the lower third of the ROK. Its radio signal was heard in Daegu, Busan, Jinhae, Pohang and Waegwan on Eagle FM 88.1/88.5 and Thunder AM 1080. AFN-K television could be seen in all but Pohang.

References

External links
 

Educational institutions established in 1958
High schools in Daegu
1958 establishments in South Korea
Boys' schools in South Korea